Roberson Creek is a  long 3rd order tributary to the Haw River in Chatham County, North Carolina.

Variant names
According to the Geographic Names Information System, it has also been known historically as:  
Robeson Creek

Course
Roberson Creek rises about 0.5 miles northeast of Round Top Mountain in Chatham County and then flows east to the Haw River at B. Everett Jordan Lake.  Roberson Creek makes up one of the arms of the lake.

Watershed
Roberson Creek drains  of area, receives about 47.4 in/year of precipitation, and has a wetness index of 413.14 and is about 70% forested.

See also
List of rivers of North Carolina

References

Additional images

External links
Robeson Creek Canoe Access

Rivers of North Carolina
Rivers of Chatham County, North Carolina